Santiago Juan Gentiletti Selak (born 9 January 1985) is an Argentine former professional footballer who played as a centre-back.

Career
Gentiletti played over 68 games for Gimnasia de La Plata before signing for Provincial Osorno of Chile in 2008. In 2009, he played for O'Higgins, also of Chile.

In 2010, he was signed by Argentinos Juniors and immediately established himself as an important member of the first team squad under manager Claudio Borghi. He was an important member of the team that won the Clausura 2010 championship having played in 16 of the club's 19 games and scored one goal during their championship winning campaign.
In August 2011 he was signed by the French Ligue 1 club Stade Brestois 29 on a loan deal.
In August 2014, after winning Copa Libertadores with San Lorenzo from Argentina, he moved to an Italian club, Lazio.

On 18 July 2016, he moved to Genoa.

On 29 August 2018, Gentiletti joined Segunda División side Albacete Balompié.

On 25 June 2019, Gentiletti joined to his country club Newell's Old Boys.

Having been injured for almost a year, Gentiletti retired from professional football on the 12th of July 2021.

Honours
Argentinos Juniors
Argentine Primera División: 2010 Clausura

San Lorenzo
Argentine Primera División: 2013 Inicial
Copa Libertadores: 2014

References

External links
 
 
 
 

1985 births
Living people
People from Caseros Department
Argentine footballers
Argentine people of Croatian descent
Argentine people of Italian descent
Association football defenders
Club de Gimnasia y Esgrima La Plata footballers
Argentinos Juniors footballers
San Lorenzo de Almagro footballers
Argentine expatriate sportspeople in Chile
O'Higgins F.C. footballers
Expatriate footballers in Chile
Provincial Osorno footballers
Argentine expatriate sportspeople in France
Stade Brestois 29 players
S.S. Lazio players
Genoa C.F.C. players
Albacete Balompié players
Chilean Primera División players
Argentine Primera División players
Ligue 1 players
Serie A players
Segunda División players
Expatriate footballers in France
Expatriate footballers in Spain
Argentine expatriate footballers
Sportspeople from Santa Fe Province